Kharaq or Kharq may refer to:
 Kharaq, North Khorasan
 Kharq, Razavi Khorasan